Vrhe is a settlement in the City Municipality of Slovenj Gradec in northern Slovenia. The area is part of the traditional region of Styria. The entire municipality is now included in the Carinthia Statistical Region.

There are two churches in the settlement. The church dedicated to Saint Agnes belongs to the Parish of Sele. It dates to the second half of the 14th century.  A second church in the northern part of the settlement is dedicated to Saint Urban and was built around 1500.

References

External links
Vrhe at Geopedia

Populated places in the City Municipality of Slovenj Gradec
Slovenj Gradec